The Shiraz Tumbler is a pigeon breed that originally came from Shiraz in south central Iran. Its nickname is Afghani Shirazi pigeon and it has also been called "lahouri" or "domgir" (in Isfahan).

The Shirazi is a "low flyer" breed of pigeon. This kind does not reach high altitude and at maximum is able to fly couple of hours. The way Shirazi pigeons fly is a combination of turning around the loft and going to a distance and keep coming back. They fly as a kit.

They are saddle (in different colours black, brown etc.) with a marking from the head all the way through the back.

Pigeon breeds originating in Iran
Pigeon breeds